William Kesling (born Kessling; 18 October 1899 - 13 October 1983) was an American architect. Kesling's career was divided into two periods: a Los Angeles period spanning from 1934 to 1937, and a San Diego period spanning from 1939 to 1962. During the former period he designed primarily in the Streamline Moderne style, and during the latter in the International Style. Kesling is recognized as one California's most prolific practitioners of Streamline Moderne.

Biography

William Kessling was born on 18 October 1899 to Adolph Kessling and Pauline Heissler, both German immigrants. Adolph Kessling (1854-1928) was born in Germany, had left home and moved to Russia at the age of 13, and eventually traveled to the United States, settling in Kansas City where he met and married Pauline Heissler. William Kessling was the fourth of their five children. The Kesslings moved from Kansas City to Brenham, Texas, where they owned a ranch, slaughterhouse, and butcher shop. In 1911, Adolph and his eldest son left the family without notice. In 1916, however, Adolph contacted his family and informed them that he was living in Calexico, California, where he owned another cattle operation and invited the family to join him. Pauline, with the four children, moved to Calexico and began working with Adolph while maintaining a separate residence. In the 1920s Adolph again left the family to look for gold in the Mojave Desert. He died in 1928 after falling off of a precipice.

Following the First World War, William Kessling moved to Los Angeles and worked as a carpenter, eventually working he was up to superintendent within the Jarboe Construction Company. In the late 1920s he changed the spelling of his last name to "Kesling" and in 1926 married Ehrma Williams (1903-1993). Around this time Kesling left his job with Jarboe and formed his own contracting company.

In the early part of 1934, Kesling founded his company Kesling Modern Structures and began designing affordable modern houses. His first project was begun that summer and completed in 1935. For the next two years, Kesling remained extremely busy, designing and building an extensive body of houses for clients including Hollywood actor Wallace Beery. During this time Kesling designed and built one of the largest oeuvres of Streamline-Moderne houses by a single architect. Arguably his most iconic houses from this period were the Vanderpool Residence and Skinner Residence, located side-by-side on Easterly Terrace in Los Angeles's Silver Lake neighborhood. In November 1936 Kesling was arrested on fraud charges, and in March 1937 was sentenced to two years probation, during which time he was disallowed from working in the building business.

In 1939, after his probation was finished, Kesling moved to La Jolla to start his business over. Throughout the Second World War he designed prefabricated houses and by the late 1940s was again designing privately commissioned houses. Perhaps his most iconic work from this period was a cliff-side house he designed for Walton McConnell. Photographs of the house taken by Julius Shulman were featured in a 1947 issue of Life.

In the early 1960s Kesling had again gotten into financial trouble and in 1962 was forced to sell his business and assets. For the rest of his career, he worked odd handy-man jobs. Kesling died on 13 October 1983, five days short of his 84th birthday.

Legacy

Kesling's work was largely unappreciated during his lifetime and forgotten after his retirement. In the 21st century, however, Kesling's buildings have gained a new-found popularity and widespread recognition. Kesling houses now command high sale prices and are desirable due to their historic and aesthetic importance. Among those who own Kesling works is actor Jay Huguley, who lives in Kesling's Wilson Residence. In 2021, the Estes House was listed for $2 million.

Works

Further reading 
Pascal, Patrick. Kesling Modern Structures: Popularizing Modern Design in Southern California 1934-1962. Los Angeles: Balcony Press, 2002.

References

1899 births
1983 deaths
20th-century American architects
American carpenters
People from Brenham, Texas
People from Calexico, California